Le Vite de’ Pittori, Scultori et Architetti. Dal Pontificato di Gregorio XII del 1572 in fino a’ tempi di Papa Urbano VIII nel 1642 ("Lives of the painters, sculptors, architects, from the papacies of Gregory XII in 1572 to Urban VIII in 1642") is an art history book by Giovanni Baglione, first published in 1642. It represents an encyclopedic compendium of biographies of the artists active in Rome during late Mannerism and early Baroque. Baglione (1566 – 1643) was a Late Mannerist and Early Baroque painter and art historian, best remembered for his writings and his acrimonious involvement with the artist Caravaggio, by whom he was nonetheless greatly influenced.

The book was first published in 1642, with a final version published in Naples in 1733, long after Baglione's death, with a biography of Salvator Rosa by Giovanni Battista Passeri as an appendix.  The poet Ottavio Tronsarelli may have contributed a good deal of the text. The biographies are structured as a series of days (giornate) for each papacy, recalling the artists active in Rome during that time. Numerous errors are present, and Baglione's prejudices are often clear; however the book is regarded as a very valuable source from a well-placed observer of the Roman art world, who knew most of his subjects personally.

Baglione's young friend Giovanni Pietro Bellori contributed a long appreciative prefatory poem to Baglione's Vite. Over half a century separated the ages of the two historiographers of the Baroque, and a thirty year-old Bellori must have been very pleased to collaborate in 1642 with his senior, the more eminent Baglione.  Years later, Bellori – older, altered, and now famous in his own right – not only repudiated this piece of juvenilia with its misguided embrace of naturalism in art but he also dismissed Baglione's Vite as worthless and poorly written. it is very likely that Bellori began to design his project of the Lives in those years as a reaction to the Lives of Baglione.

First day: Works of Gregory XIII

Jacopo Barozzi da Vignola;
Pirro Ligorio;
Giorgio Vasari; p. 10
Giulio Clovio; p. 14
Donato da Formello (Bracciano); p. 15
Jacobo Sementa; p. 16
Lorenzino da Bologna p. 17
Livio Agresti; p. 18
Marcello Venusti; p. 19
Marco da Faenza; p. 21
Girolamo da Sermoneta; p. 22
Raffaellino da Reggio; p. 23
Bartolommeo Ammanato; p. 26
Battista Naldini p. 27
Paolo Cespade p. 28
Marco da Siena p. 29
Matteo da Leccio; p. 30
Francesco Trabaldese; p. 31

Second day (Sixtus V)

Lattanzio Bolognese; p. 36
Giovanni Batista Pozzo (Giovanni Battista Pozzi); p. 37
Niccolò Circignani; p. 38
Prospero Bresciano (Prospero Scavezzi); p. 40
Matteo da Siena p. 41
Jacopo Zucchi p. 42
Giovanni Batista Montano dalla Marca p. 44
Francesco Salviati (il Volterra)
Girolamo Muziano; p. 46
Scipione Gaetano; p. 50
Giacomo del Duca; p. 51
Antonio de’ Monti; p. 53
Egnazio Danti (Ignazio Danti)

Third day (Clement VIII)

Pellegrino Pellegrini; p. 58
Taddeo Landini; p. 60
Santi Titi (Borgo San Sepolcro) (Santi di Tito); p. 61
Giacomo Rocca; p. 62
Niccolo d’ Aras (Nicolò Pippi D'Arras); p. 63
Martino Longhi (the Elder); p. 64
Egidio dell Riviera Fiammingo; p. 65
Giovanni Alberti del Borgo San Sepolcro; p. 66
Flamminio Vacca; p. 67
Tommaso Laureti; p. 68
Giovanni Battista della Porta; p. 70
Jacopino del Conte; p. 71
Pietro Paolo Olivieri; p. 72
Arrigo Fiammingo; p. 73
Giovanni Cosci Fiorentino; p. 74
Giovanni Antonio da Valsoldo; p. 74
Giacomo della Porta; p. 76
Padre Giuseppe Valeriano; p. 78
Cavalier Domenico Fontana; p. 79
Francesco da Castello; p. 82
Paris Nogari; p. 83
Stefano Pieri; p. 85
Lionardo da Serzana (Leonardo Sarzana); p. 85
Fabrizio Parmigiano; p. 86
Marco Tullio; p. 88

Fourth day Paul V

Fifth Day Urban VIII

Engravers

Sources

 Ostrow, Steven F., review of Giovanni Baglione: Artistic Reputation in Baroque Rome by Maryvelma Smith O'Neil, The Art Bulletin, Vol. 85, No. 3 (Sep., 2003), pp. 608–611

Biographies about artists
1642 books
A01
A01
A01
A01
Baglione